is a micro-asteroid on an eccentric orbit, classified as a near-Earth object of the Apollo group. It was first observed on 5 April 2010, by astronomers of the Catalina Sky Survey at Mount Lemmon Observatory, Arizona, United States, four days before a close approach to Earth at 1.1 lunar distances on 9 April 2010. It has not been observed since.

Orbit and classification 

 is an Apollo asteroid. Apollo's cross the orbit of Earth and are the largest group of near-Earth objects with nearly 10 thousand known members. It orbits the Sun in the inner main-belt at a distance of 0.93–3.69 AU once every 3 years and 6 months (1,281 days; semi-major axis of 2.31 AU). Its orbit has a high eccentricity of 0.60 and an inclination of 10° with respect to the ecliptic. With an aphelion of 3.69 AU, it is also a Mars-crossing asteroid, as it crosses the orbit of the Red Planet at 1.666 AU.

Close approach 

With a 1-day observation arc,  had a 1 in 6 million chance of impacting Earth in 2074. It was removed from the Sentry Risk Table on 8 April 2010.

2010 flyby 

Generally only asteroids larger than 35 meters across pose a threat to a town or city. There are no projection of future close approaches to Earth available.

Physical characteristics 

Based on a generic magnitude-to-diameter conversion, the asteroid measures between 19 and 36 meters in diameter, for an absolute magnitude of 22.6, and an assumed albedo between 0.057 and 0.20, which represent typical values for carbonaceous and stony asteroids, respectively.

Numbering and naming 

This minor planet has neither been numbered nor named.

See also 
 
 367943 Duende

References

External links 
 MPEG, Minor Planet Electronic Circular, 5 April 2010
 Newfound Asteroid to Buzz Earth Thursday, Foxnews
 Newly Discovered Asteroid Will Pass by Earth April 8, UniverseToday.com
 
 
 

Minor planet object articles (unnumbered)
Discoveries by the Catalina Sky Survey

Near-Earth objects in 2010
20100405